Raptor is a steel roller coaster at the Gardaland amusement park in Lake Garda, Italy. The ride is a prototype Wing Coaster design by Swiss roller coaster manufacturer Bolliger & Mabillard. Raptor opened to the public on April 1, 2011. The ride begins from an underground station and features two water splash elements. The layout features several roll overs. The trains hang over both sides of the track like X2 at Six Flags Magic Mountain but the seats do not spin.

Ride experience
After departing from the underground station, the train makes a left turn into the lift hill. After reaching the top of the  lift, the train drops back to the ground before making a sharp left over-banked turn. The train then enters a corkscrew followed by a slight upward left turn. Next, the train goes back down slightly, also going through a set of trim brakes. The train then makes another sharp left turn leading into a  zero-gravity-roll. After a sharp left turn, and right turn, the train enters a  inline twist, going through the supports of the track, a fake tree and a steel rectangle. The train then makes a left turn into the final brake run where the train then enters the station and the next riders board.

The ride lasts about 1 minute and 30 seconds.

See also
 2011 in amusement parks

References

Roller coasters introduced in 2011
Roller coasters operated by Merlin Entertainments
Roller coasters in Italy
Gardaland rides